Riddick House, also known as Riddicks Folly, is a historic home located at Suffolk, Virginia. It was built in 1837, and is a -story, five bay by four bay, Greek Revival style brick townhouse.  The front facade features a one-story diastyle Doric order portico with a triangular pediment supported by two fluted columns and two plain pilasters.  It also has a one-story tetrastyle portico added across the south end in 1905.  During the American Civil War, General John J. Peck and his staff maintained Union Army staff headquarters in the house.

It was added to the National Register of Historic Places in 1974.  It is located in the Suffolk Historic District.

Riddick's Folly is open as a historic house museum.

References

External links
 Official website

Greek Revival houses in Virginia
Houses completed in 1837
Houses on the National Register of Historic Places in Virginia
Houses in Suffolk, Virginia
National Register of Historic Places in Suffolk, Virginia
Historic house museums in Virginia
Tourist attractions in Suffolk, Virginia
Individually listed contributing properties to historic districts on the National Register in Virginia